Sebastien Tresarrieu (born 10 January 1981) is a French motorcycle racer and competes in Grasstrack, Longtrack and Speedway. Sebastien has two brothers who also compete in motorcycle racing, they are Mathieu Trésarrieu and Stéphane Trésarrieu.

World Longtrack Championship

Grand-Prix Years
 2000 - 1 app (18th) 16pts
 2001 - 1 app (20th) 2pts
 2006 - 1 app (23rd) 0pts

European Grasstrack Championship

 1998  Schwarme (6th) 14pts
 1999 Did not compete
 2000  Colomb de Lauzun (6th) 15pts
 2001  Noordwolde (18th) 4pts
 2002 Did not compete
 2003  La Reole (18th) 2pts
 2004 Did not compete
 2005 Did not compete
 2006  La Reole (8th) 22pts
 2007 Did not compete
 2008 Semi-finaliat

External links

References

French speedway riders
French motorcycle racers
1981 births
Living people
Individual Speedway Long Track World Championship riders